Kevin Lamar Cone (born March 20, 1988 in Stone Mountain, Georgia) is a retired American football wide receiver who is currently the Assistant Director of Football Operations at Georgia Tech. He was signed by the Atlanta Falcons as an undrafted free agent in 2011.

Education
Cone went to St. Pius X High School in Atlanta, Georgia. After he graduated high school he attended Shorter College and played football during the 2006 and 2007 seasons. He transferred to Georgia Tech and joined their football program as a walk-on in April 2008. After a redshirt year, he was awarded a football scholarship in August 2009.

Cone obtained a bachelor's degree in Mechanical Engineering at Georgia Tech on Dec. 18, 2010.  Cone also studied for a master's degree in Business Administration and Management at Georgia State University.

Professional career
Cone was not selected in the NFL draft.  After graduation, he began work with Westinghouse as an intern in Pittsburgh.  During this period, he trained with other NFL hopefuls waiting for future football opportunities.

Atlanta Falcons
Cone received his opportunity as undrafted free agent when the Atlanta Falcons added him to their roster after it was depleted by injuries in preseason camp. He spent most of his first year on the Falcons practice squad, but did get into a game late in the season.

Cone played in 29 games with the Atlanta Falcons from 2011-2013. He played primarily on special teams, but did catch a 49-yard touchdown in a pre-season game against the Jacksonville Jaguars on Aug 30, 2012.

Cone was released by the Atlanta Falcons on March 19, 2014.

Miami Dolphins
Cone signed with the Miami Dolphins on April 2, 2014.

After a brief stint with the Cleveland Browns, Cone re-signed with the Dolphins on August 4, 2015. On August 30, 2015, he was released by the Dolphins.

Retirement
He retired from the Winnipeg Blue Bombers in 2016 and briefly worked as Mechanical Engineer for Morrison Hershfield. In January 2017, Cone accepted the position of Assistant Director of Football Operations at Georgia Tech.

Family
Cone is the son of Ronny and Janet Cone. Both his parents graduated from Georgia Tech and his father played football at Tech from 1979-83. He has one brother named Zach and one sister named Amy.

References

External links
Georgia Tech Yellow Jackets football bio
Atlanta Falcons bio

1988 births
Living people
People from Stone Mountain, Georgia
Players of American football from Georgia (U.S. state)
Sportspeople from DeKalb County, Georgia
American football wide receivers
Georgia Tech Yellow Jackets football players
Miami Dolphins players
Cleveland Browns players
Atlanta Falcons players